Vatica parvifolia is a tree in the family Dipterocarpaceae, native to Borneo. The specific epithet parvifolia means "small leaf".

Description
The inflorescences bear cream flowers.

Distribution and habitat
Vatica parvifolia is endemic to Borneo.

Conservation
Vatica parvifolia has been assessed as vulnerable on the IUCN Red List. It is mainly threatened by logging for its timber. In Kalimantan, it is also threatened by land conversion for tree plantations and urban settlement.

References

parvifolia
Endemic flora of Borneo
Plants described in 1962